The Conseil scolaire francophone de la Colombie-Britannique (also known as Francophone Education Authority or School District No 93) is the French-language school board for all French schools located in British Columbia. Its headquarters are in Richmond in Greater Vancouver. Unlike the other school boards in British Columbia, this school board does not cover a specific geographic area, but instead takes ownership of schools based solely on language.

The school board helps ensure those with constitutional rights to minority language education under section 23 of the Canadian Charter of Rights and Freedoms receive it.

The Conseil scolaire francophone de la Colombie-Britannique offers educational programs and services geared towards the growth and cultural promotion of the province's Francophone learners. An active partner in the development of British Columbia's Francophone community, the Conseil has presently in its system, and distributed across 78 communities in the province, over 6,400 students and 46 schools. The school board also operates a French first language virtual school known as École Virtuelle.

History
Public French schooling was established by the Government of British Columbia in 1977, known as the programme cadre de français. The program was managed by various English first language school boards in British Columbia.

In 1995, the provincial government established a French first language school board, known as the Francophone School Authority, providing French first language schooling for residents residing within the areas of Chilliwack and Victoria. As a result of a court action, in December 1997, the school board is given jurisdiction over the entire province. Legislation governing the regulations of the school board was passed in the Legislative Assembly of British Columbia on 27 March 1998. The legislation, including the components that expanded the school board's jurisdiction to cover the entire province, went into effect on 1 July 1999.

Schools

Notes

See also

 Franco-Columbian
 List of school districts in British Columbia

References

External links
 

 
French-language school districts in Canada
School districts in British Columbia
Education in Richmond, British Columbia